Morita is a town in Plateaux Region, Togo.

Transport 

It has been proposed to build a station connecting this town to the national railway network.

See also 

 Railway stations in Togo

References 

Populated places in Plateaux Region, Togo